Admiral Hepburn may refer to:

Adam Hepburn, 2nd Earl of Bothwell (c. 1492–1513), Lord High Admiral of Scotland 
Arthur Japy Hepburn (1877–1964), U.S. Navy admiral
James Hepburn, 4th Earl of Bothwell (c. 1534–1578), Lord High Admiral of Scotland
Patrick Hepburn, 1st Earl of Bothwell (died 1508), Lord High Admiral of Scotland
Patrick Hepburn, 3rd Earl of Bothwell (1512–1556), Lord High Admiral of Scotland